Dioryctria tumicolella is a species of snout moth in the genus Dioryctria. It was described by Akira Mutuura, Eugene G. Munroe and Douglas Alexander Ross in 1969, and is known from British Columbia, Canada, but is possibly present in all of north-western North America.

The wingspan is 12.5–15 mm.

The larvae have been recorded feeding within blister rust (Peridermium) swellings on Pinus ponderosa.

References

Moths described in 1969
tumicolella